Jouffroy is a surname. Notable people with the surname include:

Alain Jouffroy (1928–2015), French writer, poet and artist
Claude-François-Dorothée, marquis de Jouffroy d'Abbans (1751–1832), French inventor
François Jouffroy (1806–1882), French sculptor
Jean Jouffroy (c. 1412–1473), French prelate and diplomat
Quentin Jouffroy (born 1993), French volleyball player
Théodore Simon Jouffroy (1796–1842), French philosopher

See also
Passage Jouffroy, is a covered passages of Paris, France

References